Pasquale Camerlengo (born 14 April 1966) is an Italian former competitive ice dancer who is now a coach and choreographer. With Stefania Calegari, he won gold medals at Skate America, Skate Canada, and the International de Paris, and placed fifth at the 1992 Winter Olympics. Camerlengo later competed with Diane Gerencser, placing 17th at the 1998 Winter Olympics.

Career

Competitive career 
Camerlengo competed with Stefania Calegari for around ten years. They won gold medals at the 1990 Skate America, 1990 Grand Prix International de Paris, and 1991 Skate Canada International, a silver medal at the 1992 Nations Cup, and bronze medals at the 1990 and 1991 NHK Trophy. In 1992, they achieved their highest results at the European Championships and World Championships, placing fourth at both events. They also competed at the 1992 Winter Olympics and finished fifth. They retired from competition in 1993.

In 1996, Camerlengo returned to competition with new partner Diane Gerencser. They were coached by Muriel Boucher-Zazoui in Villard-de-Lans and Lyon. The duo placed 11th at the 1997 European Championships and 17th at the 1998 Winter Olympics in Nagano, Japan. They retired from competition after the 1998 World Championships.

Coaching and choreography 
Camerlengo began choreographing in the early 1990s, doing parts of his own programs. After his first retirement from competition in 1993, Carlo Fassi hired him to do choreography for his students; Camerlengo worked in Milan for two years. 

After his final retirement, Boucher-Zazoui invited Camerlengo to work alongside her in Lyon. He also coached for a year in Berlin, Germany, and then moved to Delaware. Since September 2006, he works as a coach at the Detroit Skating Club in Bloomfield Hills, Michigan, in collaboration with former World champion ice dancer, Anjelika Krylova. He also collaborates with Massimo Scali, Natalia Annenko-Deller, and Elizabeth Punsalan.

Camerlengo currently works with: 
 Diana Davis / Gleb Smolkin
 Eva Pate / Logan Bye
 Yura Min / Daniel Eaton

He previously coached: 
 Federica Faiella / Massimo Scali
 Madison Hubbell / Keiffer Hubbell
 Nathalie Pechalat / Fabian Bourzat (until May 2013)
 Jennifer Wester / Daniil Barantsev
 Danielle O'Brien / Gregory Merriman
 Madison Hubbell / Zachary Donohue (until April 2015)
 Alexandra Paul / Mitchell Islam (until April 2015)
 Kaitlyn Weaver / Andrew Poje, 2014 World Silver medalists and 2015 World Bronze medalists 
 Rebeka Kim / Kirill Minov
 Kaitlin Hawayek / Jean-Luc Baker, 2014 World Junior champions
 Robynne Tweedale / Joseph Buckland
 Katarina Wolfkostin / Jeffrey Chen
 Christina Carriera / Anthony Ponomorenko

He has choreographed programs for many skaters, including: 

 Jeremy Abbott
 Alexandra Aldridge / Daniel Eaton
 Rie Arikawa / Kenji Miyamoto
 Lutricia Bock
 Michal Březina
 Gheorghe Chiper
 Choi Da-bin
 Alissa Czisny
 Isabel Delobel / Olivier Schoenfelder
 Jessica Dubé / Bryce Davison
 Marie-France Dubreuil / Patrice Lauzon
 Stanick Jeannette
 Roxana Luca
 Kanako Murakami
 Yasuharu Nanri
 Kaetlyn Osmond
 Evgeni Plushenko
 Adam Rippon
 Tommy Steenberg
 Akiko Suzuki
 Anna Pogorilaya
 Daisuke Takahashi
 Tomáš Verner
 Karen Chen
 Audrey Shin

Personal life 
Camerlengo and Anjelika Krylova are married with two children, Stella Camerlengo (born on July 24, 2005) and Anthony Camerlengo (born on September 10, 2007). Stella and Anthony now live in Moscow with Anjelika, while Pasquale comes to visit them every couple months. Stella says, "It's hard being away from one parent, especially in a country with a completely different culture from the United States. I go to an English school though, which is comfortable for me because I have some English speaking friends."

Results

With Calegari

With Gerencser

References

Italian male ice dancers
Olympic figure skaters of Italy
Figure skaters at the 1998 Winter Olympics
Figure skaters at the 1992 Winter Olympics
Italian figure skating coaches
Figure skating choreographers
1966 births
Living people
Figure skaters from Milan
20th-century Italian dancers
21st-century Italian dancers